Al-Wayziyya was a Palestinian village in the Safad Subdistrict, located south east of  Yarda. It was depopulated during the 1947–48 Civil War in Mandatory Palestine on May 1, 1948, by the Palmach's First Battalion of Operation Yiftach. It was located 8.5 km northeast of Safad.

In 1945, the village had a population of 100. A shrine for a local sage known as al-Shaykh al-Wayzi was located in the village.

History
The majority of the villagers were Bedouin farmers. A shrine for Shaykh al-Wayzi and a quarry were located nearby.

British Mandate era
In the 1922 census of Palestine conducted by the British Mandate authorities, Wazia had a population of 30, all Muslim.

In  the 1945 statistics  the population was  100 Muslims,  with a total of 6,361 dunams of land, according to an official land and population survey.   Of this, Arabs used 795   dunums  for plantations or irrigable land, 1,623 for cereals; while a total  of 2,114 dunams was classified as uncultivable.

1948, aftermath
During the 1948 war, nearby Mughr al-Khayt was struck by mortars on 2 May, while villages to the north were evacuated earlier because of the threat of the oncoming war.

Today there are no Israeli settlements on village lands and the shrine of Shaykh al-Wayzi is the only remaining landmark. Only rubble and grasses and trees remain, although the Zionists established the settlement of Mahanayim in 1939, which is located about 1.5 km southeast of where Al-Wayziyya was located.

References

Bibliography

External links
Welcome to al-Wayziyya
al-Wayziyya, at Zochrot
Survey of Western Palestine, map 4: IAA, Wikimedia commons
al-Wayziyya, at Khalil Sakakini Cultural Center
Al-Wayziyya, Dr. Khalil Rizk.

Arab villages depopulated during the 1948 Arab–Israeli War
District of Safad